William Bennett Fleming (October 29, 1803 – August 19, 1886) was a U.S. Representative from Georgia.

Born on a plantation near Flemington, Georgia, Fleming attended the common schools and was graduated from Yale College in 1825.
He studied law.
He was admitted to the bar and practiced in Savannah, Georgia.
He served as judge of the superior court of Chatham County, Georgia from 1847 to 1849 and 1853–1868.
He resumed the practice of law in Savannah.
Recorder of the city of Savannah from 1868 until the office was abolished.

Fleming was elected as a Democrat to the Forty-fifth Congress to fill the vacancy caused by the death of Julian Hartridge and served from February 10, 1879, to March 3, 1879.
He was not a candidate for renomination.
He served as again judge of the superior court from 1879 until 1881, when he resigned on account of ill health.
He retired to Walthourville, Georgia, and died there August 19, 1886.
He was interred in Laurel Grove Cemetery, Savannah, Georgia.

References

1803 births
1886 deaths
Yale Law School alumni
Georgia (U.S. state) state court judges
Democratic Party members of the United States House of Representatives from Georgia (U.S. state)
People from Liberty County, Georgia
Politicians from Savannah, Georgia
American slave owners
19th-century American politicians
Yale College alumni
19th-century American judges